The Gologan is a left tributary of the river Geru in Romania. It flows into the Geru in Costache Negri.

References

Rivers of Romania
Rivers of Galați County